Sanne Troelsgaard Nielsen (born 15 August 1988) is a Danish professional footballer who plays as a midfielder for Reading of the FA Women's Super League. Since 2008, she has been a part of the senior Danish national team.

Club career
In 2011, Troelsgaard was named Denmark's Player of the Year after scoring 29 goals in her first 15 matches for Skovbakken. In February 2017, Troelsgaard signed for FC Rosengård in the Swedish Damallsvenskan.

On 21 December 2021, Reading announced the signing of Troelsgaard on a contract until June 2023.

International career
Troelsgaard made her senior international debut for Denmark in March 2008, playing the last four minutes of a 1–0 win over Finland at the 2008 Algarve Cup. At the 2011 Matchworld Women's Cup in June 2011, she scored all three goals in the Danes' 3–0 win over Wales.

A serious illness in the family caused Troelsgaard to withdraw from national coach Kenneth Heiner-Møller's squad for UEFA Women's Euro 2013.

Career statistics

Club

International goals

Honours
Brøndby IF
 Elitedivisionen: Winner 2010–11, 2012–13
 Danish Women's Cup: Winner 2010, 2011, 2013, 2014

FC Rosengård
 Damallsvenskan: Winner: 2019, Runner-up: 2020, 2017
 Svenska Cupen Women: 2017/2018, 2016/2017

References

External links
Profile at DBU
 

1988 births
Living people
Danish women's footballers
Women's association football midfielders
Brøndby IF (women) players
FC Rosengård players
Kolding IF players
Damallsvenskan players
Denmark women's international footballers
FIFA Century Club
Danish expatriate women's footballers
Danish expatriate sportspeople in Sweden
Expatriate women's footballers in Sweden
Reading F.C. Women players
Women's Super League players
Danish expatriate sportspeople in England
Expatriate women's footballers in England
UEFA Women's Euro 2022 players
UEFA Women's Euro 2017 players

Association football midfielders
Denmark international footballers